Three ships of the United States Navy have been named Austin.

 , originally a sloop-of-war in the Texas Navy, was named in honor of Stephen Fuller Austin.
 , a destroyer escort, honored Chief Carpenter John Arnold Austin.
 , was an amphibious transport dock named for Austin, Texas.

Sources

United States Navy ship names